A pillbox is a type of blockhouse, or concrete dug-in guard-post, often camouflaged, normally equipped with  loopholes through which defenders can fire weapons. It is in effect a  trench firing step, hardened to protect against small-arms fire and grenades, and raised to improve the field of fire.

The modern concrete pillbox originated on the  Western Front of World War I, in the  German Army
in 1916.

Etymology 

The origin of the term is disputed. It has been widely assumed to be a jocular reference to the perceived similarity of the fortifications to the cylindrical and hexagonal boxes in which medical pills were once sold; also, the first German concrete pillboxes discovered by the Allies in Belgium were so small and light that they were easily tilted or turned upside down by the nearby explosion of even medium (240mm) shells. However, it seems more likely that it originally alluded to pillar boxes, with a comparison being drawn between the loophole on the pillbox and the letter-slot on the pillar box.

The term is found in print in The Times on 2 August 1917, following the beginning of the Third Battle of Ypres; and in The Scotsman on 17 September 1917, following the German withdrawal onto the Hindenburg Line. Other unpublished occurrences have been found in war diaries and similar documents of about the same date; and in one instance, as "Pillar Box", as early as March 1916.

Characteristics 

The concrete nature of pillboxes means that they are a feature of prepared positions. Some pillboxes were designed to be prefabricated and transported to their location for assembly. During World War I, Sir Ernest William Moir produced a design for concrete machine-gun pillboxes constructed from a system of interlocking precast concrete blocks, with a steel roof. Around 1500 Moir pillboxes were eventually produced (with blocks cast at Richborough in Kent) and sent to the Western Front in 1918.

Pillboxes are often camouflaged in order to conceal their location and to maximize the element of surprise. They may be part of a trench system, form an interlocking line of defence with other pillboxes by providing covering fire to each other (defence in depth), or they may be placed to guard strategic structures such as bridges and jetties.

Pillboxes were hard to defeat and required artillery, anti-tank weapons or grenades to overcome.

Uses 

The French Maginot Line built between the world wars consisted of a massive bunker and tunnel complex, but as most of it was below ground little could be seen from the ground level. The exception were the concrete blockhouses, gun turrets, pillboxes and cupolas which were placed above ground to allow the garrison of the Maginot line to engage an attacking enemy.

Between the Abyssinian Crisis of 1936 and World War II, the British built about 200 pillboxes on the island of Malta for defence in case of an Italian invasion. Fewer than 100 pillboxes still exist, and most are found on the northeastern part of the island. A few of them have been restored and are cared for, but many others were demolished. Some pillboxes are still being destroyed nowadays as the authorities do not consider them to have any architectural or historic value, despite heritage NGOs calling to preserve them.

About 28,000 pillboxes and other hardened field fortifications were constructed in Britain in 1940 as part of the British anti-invasion preparations of World War II. About 6,500 of these structures still survive.

Pillboxes for the Czechoslovak border fortifications were built before World War II in Czechoslovakia in defence against a German attack. None of these were actually used against their intended enemy during the German invasion, but some were used against the advancing Soviet armies in 1945. The Japanese also made use of pillboxes in their fortifications of Iwo Jima, and on other occupied islands and territories.

During the 2022 Russian invasion of Ukraine, pillboxes have been used to gain advantages in trench warfare.

Gallery

Notes

References

External links 

 

Fortifications by type
.
Concrete buildings and structures
Military science